China Entertainment Television (CETV) was a Mandarin Chinese-language satellite television channel in the Greater China region, owned jointly by the Hong Kong-based TOM Group (majority shareholder) and the United States’ TBS Networks (36% shareholder). The broadcaster was originally based in Kowloon Tong, Hong Kong, but moved to Shenzhen, China since 2003.

On 25 October 2016, TOM Group announced that operations of the television station would be ceased at the end of 2016. The Communications Authority approved to end its non-domestic television programme service licence on 23 December 2016 and it ceased broadcast on 31 December 2016.

External links 
  Official website
  TOM Group Television and Entertainment

References

Warner Bros. Discovery Asia-Pacific
Television networks in China
Television channels and stations established in 1995
Mass media in Shenzhen